Phi Lambda Upsilon National Honorary Chemical Society was founded in 1899 at the Noyes Laboratory of the University of Illinois.  Phi Lambda Upsilon was the first honor society dedicated to scholarship in a single discipline, chemistry.

Objectives
The aims and purposes of the Society are summarized in its constitution – the promotion of high scholarship and original investigation in all branches of pure and applied chemistry. The founders envisioned a society dedicated to these objectives which would serve the field of chemistry in much the same manner as Phi Beta Kappa does the humanities; Sigma Xi, scientific research; and Tau Beta Pi, engineering. Throughout its history, Phi Lambda Upsilon has been consistently devoted to its objectives as an Honor Society.

History
Phi Lambda Upsilon was founded as an honorary chemical society in March 1899, at the University of Illinois. This was the first honor society dedicated to a single scientific discipline. A survey of our history reveals three distinct periods. Founding, growth and entrenchment of Alpha chapter at the University of Illinois comprise the first period. The second period began in 1906 when Beta chapter was established at the University of Wisconsin. Five more chapters were chartered prior to 29 June 1911, the date of the convention at Indianapolis at which the national society was organized and the second period reached its culmination. From 1911 to date, the Society has effected a gradual rise in the standards for membership. This period has also been characterized by the development of programs of activity within the chapters consistent with the honorary character of the Society. 

Phi Lambda Upsilon has installed more than seventy-five chapters with approximately 60,000 members.

Membership
Members are elected by the chapters or At-Large on the basis of their academic achievement and promise. Membership includes exceptional students of pure and applied chemistry selected from the junior, senior, or graduate classes, and also from well qualified members of faculties, staffs, as well as from selected post-doctoral students engaged in chemical endeavors in affiliation with qualified institutions of higher learning.

Honorary Membership
Honorary membership is the highest honor the Society may bestow upon an individual. Honorary members are scientists of national or international reputation in a field of chemistry and are chosen by a vote of the chapters. Regular membership in the Society in no way precludes later election to honorary membership. This honor has been bestowed upon only two hundred and ten individuals in the ninety-five year history of the Society. The roll of honorary members includes the names of prominent American and foreign chemists, including virtually all American Nobel Laureates in Chemistry.

Triennial Congress
The Executive Committee meets triennially with delegates from local chapters nationwide every 3 years to discuss the business of PLU and to elect the national officers for the next triennium. National officers are elected from PLU members that are faculty, governmental, or industrial chemists. Voting delegates are graduate or undergraduate PLU members with each chapter being able to cast one vote on each issue raised or national office being elected. Active chapters may send one voting delegate whose travel expenses will be reimbursed, although additional delegates from a given chapter and At-large members are also invited to attend.

References

External links
ΦΛΥ Society Homepage

Honor societies
Student organizations established in 1899
1899 establishments in Illinois